Tresayes Quarry  is a nature reserve near Roche in Cornwall.
It is also a geological nature reserve of Cornwall Wildlife Trust and is designated as a (non-statutory) County Geology Site

Geology
Pegmatites can be found here. They are formed by the action of molten magma rising from deep within the Earth's crust. Associated with the pegmatites, rare elements, such as niobium, cerium and beryllium also occur.

History

When the quarry was first opened in the late 19th Century, it was a source of pure feldspar which was used in the glass making industry. The site was known locally as the Glass Mine. It closed for several years but reopened in 1917, during the First World War, to provide feldspar for electrical porcelain.

References

Nature reserves of the Cornwall Wildlife Trust
Quarries in Cornwall